Notable eateries in Singapore are café, coffee shop, convenience stores, fast food restaurant, food courts, hawker centres, restaurant (casual), speciality food shops, and fine dining restaurants.

According to Singstat in 2014 there were 6,668 outlets, where 2,426 are considered as sit down places. According to ACRA every day two new restaurants open daily in Singapore.

The variety of Singaporean cuisine covers basically all notable ethnic groups and cultures.

Types of restaurant

Fine dining restaurants
The city-state has a very wide selection of food places such as simple kitchens or high-priced restaurants. The area of fine dining restaurants is also covered with a wide penetration of celebrity chefs including: Jamie Oliver (Jamie's Italian), Wolfgang Puck (CUT), Mario Batali (Osteria Mozza), David Myers (Adrift), Gordon Ramsay (Bread Street Kitchen). Most of them are located at Marina Bay Sands.

Hawker centre and street food

Singapore has a burgeoning street food scene. It was introduced to the country by immigrants from India, Malaysia and China. Cuisine from their native countries was sold by them on the streets to other immigrants seeking a familiar taste. Street food is now sold in hawker centres with communal seating areas that contain hundreds of food stalls. Typically, these areas have plastic seating and are covered by makeshift tin roofs, but some are located in casinos or hotels such as the Marina Bay Sands resort. Dishes served are varied and range from curries, rice and noodle-based dishes as well as those eaten less commonly by western tourists, such as chicken feet or pig's organ soup. The food is not limited to just dishes from Singapore or neighbouring Malaysia, and can include those of Chinese or Indian origin.

Cafes
Cafes are another new popular option for Singaporeans in recent years. Besides large coffee chains such as Starbucks and The Coffee Bean & Tea Leaf, new emerging cafes are offering Instagram-worthy food and decent coffee. Diners not only expect good coffee but have high standards for both the taste and appearance of café foods. Popular cafe foods include varieties of Eggs Benedict, pancake and French toast.

See also
 Food and drink prohibitions
 List of coffeehouse chains
 List of chicken restaurants
 List of countries with organic agriculture regulation
 List of shopping malls in Singapore
 List of supermarket chains in Singapore
 List of vegetarian restaurants
 List of restaurants in Singapore

References

External links